Evangeline Barongo is a Ugandan author of children's literature.  Barongo is a founding member of the Uganda Children’s Writers and Illustrators Association (UCWIA), a platform that brings together writers and illustrators of children’s books, librarians, teachers, publishers, and booksellers. She is also a member of the Reading Association of Uganda (RAU), Uganda Library and Information Association and the International Board on Books for Young People (IBBY) Uganda chapter established in 2004. She has served on the board of the National Book Trust of Uganda since its inception in 1997.

Early life and education
She trained as a nursery nurse and worked for a year in England after studying a course in children's psychology. She later earned a diploma in Library Science from Bayero University Kano in Nigeria before working as a librarian at the university. She returned to Uganda in 1986 to work with the Uganda Public Libraries Board while running a children's library service in Kampala. In 1991, Barongo won a two-month scholarship at the International Youth Library in Munich.

Writing
Barongo has undertaken children’s projects in Sweden, South Africa, and the United States. She writes in both English and Runyoro, her mother tongue. Her books are marketed in Europe and have won her several awards, among which is the NABOTU author of the year in 2008. Barongo is now retired from active civil service but owns a bookshop in Hoima and continues to write for children and stay involved in children’s reading promotion activities.

Published works

Books

 with H. Hoveka
 with Ruth M. Mwayi
The ten foolish goats
Our escape from school discovered
We Are All Animals
Pilo and Joba
Who Owns The Fruit Tree
Kaheru the Orphan
How hare became a king 
Ngonzaki and her decorated letters 
 Lazy crocodile and wise monkey
 East Africa: Silent Partners

 O meu nome é Criança da Rua, Pedinte ... Rosa

Papers
"Silent Partners", 1997

References

External links 

"Evangeline Ledi Barongo" 

Living people
Year of birth missing (living people)
Ugandan women writers
Ugandan women short story writers
Ugandan short story writers
Ugandan children's writers
Ugandan women children's writers
20th-century Ugandan women writers
21st-century Ugandan women writers
Kumusha
20th-century short story writers
21st-century short story writers